Psammoduon is a genus of spiders in the family Zodariidae. It was first described in 1991 by Jocqué. , it contains 3 species found in Namibia and South Africa.

References

Zodariidae
Araneomorphae genera
Spiders of Africa